Segeberg – Stormarn-Mitte is an electoral constituency (German: Wahlkreis) represented in the Bundestag. It elects one member via first-past-the-post voting. Under the current constituency numbering system, it is designated as constituency 8. It is located in south central Schleswig-Holstein, comprising most of the Segeberg district and northwestern parts of the Stormarn district.

Segeberg – Stormarn-Mitte was created for the 1976 federal election. Since 2021, it has been represented by Bengt Bergt of the Social Democratic Party (SPD).

Geography
Segeberg – Stormarn-Mitte is located in south central Schleswig-Holstein. As of the 2021 federal election, it comprises most of the Segeberg district (with the exception of the urban municipality of Bad Bramstedt and the Ämter of Bad Bramstedt-Land and Boostedt-Rickling) and northwestern parts of the Stormarn district (specifically the urban municipalities of Ammersbek, Bad Oldesloe, Bargteheide, the Ämter of Bad Oldesloe-Land and Bargteheide-Land, and the municipality of Tangstedt).

History
Segeberg – Stormarn-Mitte was created in 1976, then known as Segeberg – Stormarn-Nord. It contained parts of the abolished constituencies of Segeberg – Eutin and Stormarn – Herzogtum Lauenburg. Originally, it covered the entirety of the Segeberg district; however, the Ämter of Bad Bramstedt-Land and Boostedt-Rickling were transferred to different constituencies in the 2002 election. In addition, the municipality of Reinfeld and the Amt of Nordstormarn were originally part of Segeberg – Stormarn-Nord; they were transferred to Ostholstein constituency in the 1998 election. Conversely, the municipality of Ammersbek was transferred to Segeberg – Stormarn-Nord from Herzogtum Lauenburg – Stormarn-Süd in the 2002 election. The constituency acquired its current name in the 2013 election.

Members
The constituency was held by the Christian Democratic Union (CDU) from its creation in 1976 until 1980, during which time it was represented by Peter Kurt Würzbach. It was won by the Social Democratic Party (SPD) in 1980, and represented by Günther Heyenn for a single term. Former member Würzbach regained the constituency in 1983, and represented it until 1998. From 1998 to 2005, it was held by the SPD and its member was Franz Thönnes. Gero Storjohann of the CDU was elected in 2005, and re-elected in 2009, 2013, and 2017. Bengt Bergt won the constituency for the SPD in 2021.

Election results

2021 election

2017 election

2013 election

2009 election

References

Federal electoral districts in Schleswig-Holstein
2002 establishments in Germany
Constituencies established in 2002
Stormarn (district)
Segeberg